

Music videos

Video albums

References 

Videographies of Mexican artists
Videography